John Derek Twigg (born 9 July 1959) is a British Labour Party politician who has served as the Member of Parliament (MP) for Halton in Cheshire since the 1997 general election.

Early life
Twigg attended Bankfield High School (now Ormiston Chadwick Academy) in Widnes, and afterwards Halton College of Further Education (now Riverside College). At the age of 16, he joined the Civil Service and worked for the Department for Employment (at Runcorn) for the following 19 years.

At 18, Twigg became Branch Secretary of the Civil and Public Services Association (now part of the Public and Commercial Services Union) before joining the Labour Party in 1979. He was elected to Cheshire County Council at the age of 21, serving as a county councillor until 1985. In 1983 he was elected to Halton Borough Council. Between 1996 and 1997, he also worked as a political consultant.

Parliamentary career
At the general election in 1997, Twigg succeeded Gordon Oakes as Member of Parliament for the constituency of Halton. He made his maiden speech in the House of Commons on 10 June 1997. He was appointed Parliamentary Private Secretary to Helen Liddell, and then to Stephen Byers, before serving as a Government Whip from June 2002 until 2004.

In December 2004, Twigg was appointed Parliamentary Under-Secretary of State at the Department for Education and Skills. On 1 May 2005, he was booed and jeered while defending school league tables at the annual National Association of Head Teachers conference. After the general election of May 2005, he became Under-Secretary of State in the Department for Transport.

In September 2006, Twigg was appointed Under-Secretary of State and Minister for Veterans at the Ministry of Defence. In October 2008, he was replaced in this position and, declining the offer of another ministerial post, returned to the back benches.

In 2013, he was one of 22 Labour MPs to vote against the Marriage (Same Sex Couples) Bill, which eventually passed with cross-party support.

Personal life
Twigg married Mary Cassidy in January 1988 in Widnes. He has a son and a daughter. Twigg's wife died on 26 November 2019; this led to him stepping away from his general election campaign and allowing his constituency party to run it on his behalf.

Twigg's interests outside politics include hill walking, military history (particularly World War II) and rugby league. A lifelong Liverpool FC supporter, Twigg attended the 1989 FA Cup semi-final tie between Liverpool and Nottingham Forest at the Hillsborough stadium, and watched the unfolding Hillsborough disaster from the north stand.

References

External links
Derek Twigg, MP official constituency website
Debrett's People of Today

 Derek Twigg booed at the Headmasters conference in May 2005
 , video

1959 births
Living people
People from Widnes
English people of Welsh descent
Labour Party (UK) MPs for English constituencies
Labour Friends of Israel
UK MPs 1997–2001
UK MPs 2001–2005
UK MPs 2005–2010
UK MPs 2010–2015
UK MPs 2015–2017
UK MPs 2017–2019
UK MPs 2019–present